The 1929–30 French Ice Hockey Championship was the 14th edition of the French Ice Hockey Championship, the national ice hockey championship in France. Chamonix Hockey Club won the championship for the sixth time.

Final
 Chamonix Hockey Club - Club des Sports d’Hiver de Paris 2:0 (1:0, 0:0, 1:0)

External links
Season on hockeyarchives.info

French
1929–30 in French ice hockey
Ligue Magnus seasons